The Marcel-Piché Prize (French language: prix Marcel-Piché) is awarded to a researcher at the Institut de recherches cliniques de Montréal (IRCM) "in recognition of the quality of [biomedical] research and in recognition of the contribution to the growth and outreach of the Institute." The prize is named after Marcel Piché, a Montreal lawyer involved with the IRCM.

Recipients
Source: IRCM
1976 - Wojciech Nowaczynski
1977 - Roger Boucher
1978 - Michel Chrétien
1979 - André Barbeau
1980 - Otto Kuchel
1981 - Jean Davignon
1982 - Shri V. Pande
1983 - Nabil Seidah
1984 - Marc Cantin
1985 - Paul Jolicoeur
1986 - Louis Yves Marcel
1987 - Peter W. Schiller
1988 - Ram Sairam
1989 - Pavel Hamet
1990 - David J. Roy
1991 - Ernesto Luis Schiffrin
1992 - Jacques Drouin
1993 - Rafick-Pierre Sékaly
1994 - Mona Nemer
1995 - Louis-Gilles Durand
1996 - Trang Hoang
1997 - Vincent F. Castellucci
1998 - Jacques Genest
2000 - Guy Sauvageau
2002 - André Veillette
2004 - Yvan Guindon
2006 - Pierre Larochelle
2008 - Timothy L. Reude
2012 - Éric A. Cohen
2014 - Jean-François Côté
2017 - Frédéric Charron

See also

 List of medicine awards
 List of prizes named after people

External links
Institut de recherche clinique de Montréal – Marcel-Piché Award

Canadian science and technology awards
Awards established in 1976